The electoral district of Melton is an electoral district of the Victorian Legislative Assembly. 
It contains the towns of Aintree, Bacchus Marsh, Balliang, Balliang East, Blackwood, Brookfield, Greendale, Kurunjang, Melton, Melton South, Melton West, Mount Cottrell, Sydenham West, and Toolern Vale as well as parts of Diggers Rest, Plumpton, Rockbank and Truganina.

Members for Melton

Election results

References

External links
 District profile from the Victorian Electoral Commission

Electoral districts of Victoria (Australia)
1992 establishments in Australia
City of Melton
Shire of Moorabool
Electoral districts and divisions of Greater Melbourne